Martha Harris (born 19 August 1994) is an English footballer who plays as a full-back for Birmingham City of the FA Women's Championship.

Harris has represented England at under-19, under-20 and under-23 level and was named the inaugural PFA Women's Young Player of the Year in 2014.

Club career

Lincoln Ladies
Harris made her league debut for Lincoln Ladies (since re-located and re-branded as Notts County) on 26 August 2012 in a FA WSL match against Liverpool, coming on as a 59th-minute substitute for Bonnie Horwood. In all, she made three substitute appearances in the 2012 WSL season, with the team managed by her father Glen Harris. The following season saw new manager Rick Passmore take charge of the team, and this coincided with Harris becoming a key part of the Lincoln first team, making twelve starts and one substitute appearance in the Lady Imps fourteen league games.

Liverpool
Her performances in the 2013 season were enough to earn a move to Liverpool, where she signed a two-year contract. She also became the first ever winner of the PFA Women's Young Player of the Year award in April 2014. In Harris's first season at Liverpool, they retained their WSL title on the final day of the season. She also represented Liverpool in the UEFA Women's Champions League.

Harris was ever-present in the 2015 FA WSL season but the club limped to a seventh-place finish. In November 2015, she signed a new contract with Liverpool. On 12 May 2016, she was named Liverpool Ladies Player of the Season.

Manchester United
 
On 13 July 2018, it was announced that Harris was joining Manchester United for their inaugural season. On 9 September, she made her debut for the club in a 12–0 away victory over Aston Villa in the Championship. She scored her first goal for the club on 28 April 2019, a penalty in a 5–0 away win against Millwall Lionesses.

Having been limited to three appearances in all competitions including one 10 minute substitute appearance in the league during the 2021–22 season, it was announced that Harris would be leaving upon the expiry of her contract in June 2022.

Birmingham City
On 14 July 2022, Harris signed a one-year contract plus an additional option year with newly-relegated Championship side Birmingham City.

International career
Harris was part of the England under-19 team who finished as runners-up to France at the 2013 UEFA Women's Under-19 Championship in Wales.

In her first season with Liverpool, she was called up to the under-20 squad for the 2014 FIFA U-20 Women's World Cup. She scored in England's opening match, a 1–1 draw with South Korea, but the next two matches were lost and England went out in the first round. Harris then graduated to the under-23 team.

Personal life
Harris comes from a footballing family in Scothern, who in 2011 were all associated with Lincoln Ladies or Lincoln City. Her father Glen Harris had two spells as manager of Lincoln Ladies and later managed Doncaster Rovers Belles, before joining Manchester United as an assistant manager in 2018. Older sister Megan was club captain at Lincoln until quitting football when she became pregnant with twins in 2014. Megan is married to former England captain Casey Stoney. Younger brother Liam is a youth team player at Lincoln City, and Martha's twin sister Emily plays recreationally, though she was formerly a teammate of Martha's at Lincoln.

Career statistics
Club

HonoursLiverpool FA Women's Super League: 2014Manchester United FA Women's Championship: 2018–19Individual'
 PFA FA WSL 1 Team of the Year: 2013–14
 PFA Women's Young Player of the Year: 2014
Liverpool Women's Player of the Season: 2016

References

External links
 Profile at the Manchester United F.C. website
 
 
 
 

1994 births
Living people
English women's footballers
England women's under-23 international footballers
Notts County L.F.C. players
Liverpool F.C. Women players
Manchester United W.F.C. players
Women's Super League players
Women's association football fullbacks